Mammillaria carmenae, the Isla Carmen pincushion cactus, is a species of flowering plant in the family Cactaceae.

It is native to Tamaulipas state, in eastern central Mexico.

The clustered egg-shaped stems, 3–4 cm thick, are covered in creamy-coloured yellow down and bristles. In spring they bear pale cream or pink-tinged flowers with yellow centres.

Taxonomy 

Mammillaria carmenae was named by Marcelino Castañeda y Nuñez de Caceres in 1953, after his second wife, Carmen Gonzales-Castaneda.

Cultivation
Mammillaria carmenae is one of several Mammillaria species to be cultivated. In temperate regions it must be grown under glass with heat. It has gained the Royal Horticultural Society's Award of Garden Merit.

References

carmenae
Cacti of Mexico
Endemic flora of Mexico
Flora of Tamaulipas